Age class structure in fisheries and wildlife management is a part of population assessment. Age class structures can be used to model many populations including trees and fish. This method can be used to predict the occurrence of forest fires within a forest population. Age can be determined by counting growth rings in fish scales, otoliths, cross-sections of fin spines for species with thick spines such as triggerfish, or teeth for a few species. Each method has its merits and drawbacks. Fish scales are easiest to obtain, but may be unreliable if scales have fallen off the fish and new ones grown in their places. Fin spines may be unreliable for the same reason, and most fish do not have spines of sufficient thickness for clear rings to be visible. Otoliths will have stayed with the fish throughout its life history, but obtaining them requires killing the fish. Also, otoliths often require more preparation before ageing can occur.

Analyzing fisheries age class structure
An example of using age class structure to learn about a population is a regular bell curve for the population of 1-5 year-old fish with a very low population for the 3-year-olds. An age class structure with gaps in population size like the one described earlier implies a bad spawning year 3 years ago in that species. 

Often fish in younger age class structures have very low numbers because they were small enough to slip through the sampling nets, and may in fact have a very healthy population.

See also
 Identification of aging in fish
 Population pyramid
 Population dynamics of fisheries

References

Population ecology
Fisheries science